Terminalia prunioides, the purple-pod cluster-leaf or purple-pod terminalia, is a small African tree in the family Combretaceae. It is native to the eastern and south-central parts of the continent.

References

prunioides
Flora of Africa